Scott Alan Sims (born April 18, 1955) is an American former professional basketball player.

A 6'1" point guard from the University of Missouri, Sims was selected by the San Antonio Spurs in the fifth round of the 1977 NBA draft. He played 12 games with the Spurs during the 1977-78 NBA season, averaging 2.5 points per game.

Notes

1955 births
Living people
American men's basketball players
Basketball players from Missouri
Missouri Tigers men's basketball players
People from Kirksville, Missouri
Point guards
San Antonio Spurs draft picks
San Antonio Spurs players